BNet may refer to:

Bungie.net, homepage of news and updates for Bungie and Destiny.
Battle.net, an online gaming service provided by Blizzard Entertainment
Student Radio Network,  a group of radio stations in New Zealand previously branded as bNet
beibl.net (BNET), a Welsh Bible translation.
BNET, a defunct online magazine about business management owned by CBS Interactive